"Dear Lie" is a song by American group TLC. It was written by Kenneth "Babyface" Edmonds and band member Tionne "T-Boz" Watkins for the trio's third studio album FanMail (1999), featuring production by Edmonds. The song was released as the album's third and final single on December 6, 1999, peaking at number 51 on the US Billboard Hot 100 and reaching the top 40 in several other countries. "Dear Lie" is included on the group's 2009 compilation album, We Love TLC.

Background and composition
The idea for the song initially came from a poem written by Tionne "T-Boz" Watkins titled "What's My Name", which was published in her book of semi-autobiographical poetry called Thoughts. The poem was later turned into a song with the help of Babyface. Watkins discussed that her father constantly lied, which put a strain on their relationship. Watkins stated that the song began with the group's vulnerability and transformed into "a place of strength". Rozonda "Chilli" Thomas enjoyed that the song played out as a metaphor for power, stating that You can hear a lie that somebody says about you and it's not true. But it can really have so much power over you and that is why it sucks. But you've got to take that power back. We get so caught up sometimes in being upset about things and the person that we're allowing to have that type of power over us are doing just fine and as they say these days, living their best life.

Commercial performance
The song reached the top 40 in several countries, including Australia, Canada, Ireland, New Zealand, and the United Kingdom. It also reached number 51 on the US Billboard Hot 100.

Music video
A music video for "Dear Lie", directed by Bille Woodruff, was shot on September 26, 1999. This video features solo parts of both Thomas and Watkins in an apartment, confronted by hyperactive and overconfident alter-egos and trying to tune them out, and performance shots of Watkins, Lisa "Left Eye" Lopes, and Thomas in a hallway. At the end shot, Lopes is shown running down the hall, knocking at the doors before running out of the frame. Reportedly, none of the performers were on speaking terms with each other during the video shoot due to Lopes' frustrations with the FanMail album. Lopes stated in an online interview in 2001 that none of the members of TLC liked the video. The video was only released in foreign countries, and aired exclusively on MTV UK on December 9, 1999.

Track listings

Australian CD single
 "Dear Lie" (radio edit) – 3:55
 "Dear Lie" (album version) – 5:10
 "Unpretty" (MJ Cole mix vox up) – 4:46
 "Sleigh Ride" (album version) – 3:43

European CD single
 "Dear Lie" (radio edit) – 3:55
 "Sleigh Ride" (album version) – 3:43

UK CD single
 "Dear Lie" (radio edit) – 3:55
 "Dear Lie" (album version) – 5:10
 "Sleigh Ride" (album version) – 3:43

UK cassette single
 "Dear Lie" (album version) – 5:10
 "Sleigh Ride" (album version) – 3:43

Personnel
Personnel are adapted from the album's liner notes.

 TLC: vocals
 Tionne "T-Boz" Watkins: writer, background vocals
 Debra Killings: background vocals
 Babyface: writer, producer, keyboards, drum programming, electric and acoustic guitars
 Greg Phillinganes: Wurlitzer
 Nathan East: bass
 Michael Thompson: electric guitar
 Paulinho Da Costa: percussion
 Paul Boutin: recording
 Vernon J. Mungo: assistant engineer
 Jon Gass: mixing
 Ely’k: assistant mix engineer
 John Hanes: Pro Tools engineer
 Ivy Skoff: production coordinator

Charts

Weekly charts

Year-end charts

Release history

References

1998 songs
1999 singles
Arista Records singles
Bertelsmann Music Group singles
LaFace Records singles
Music videos directed by Bille Woodruff
Songs written by Babyface (musician)
Songs written by Tionne Watkins
Song recordings produced by Babyface (musician)
TLC (group) songs